Ludvig Ellefsrød (29 September 1894 - 3 January 1983) was a Norwegian politician for the Conservative Party.

He served as a deputy representative to the Norwegian Parliament from Rogaland during the terms 1950–1953, 1954–1957 and 1958–1961.

References

1894 births
1983 deaths
Conservative Party (Norway) politicians
Deputy members of the Storting
Rogaland politicians